The permanent representative of the Libyan state to the United Nations is the leader of the Libyan delegation to the United Nations, and in charge of the Libyan Mission to the United Nations. Libyan representatives to the UN hold the personal rank of ambassador.

The Permanent Representative, currently Elmahdi S. Elmajerbi, is charged with representing the Libyan government in the United Nations and during almost all plenary meetings of the General Assembly, except in the rare situation in which a senior personnel of the Libyan government (such as the Libyan Foreign Secretary or the Libyan Head of State) is present. 

Elmahdi S. Elmajerbi, acts as Chargé d'affaires under the command of the Presidential Council of Libya, led by Fayez al-Sarraj.

List of Ambassadors
The following is a chronological list of those who have held the office:

References

United Nations
Libya and the United Nations